Arhopala havilandi is a butterfly in the family Lycaenidae. It was described by George Thomas Bethune-Baker in 1896. It is found in the Indomalayan realm.

Subspecies
A. h. havilandi Borneo
A. h. kota (Evans, 1957) Peninsular Malaya

References

External links

Arhopala Boisduval, 1832 at Markku Savela's Lepidoptera and Some Other Life Forms. Retrieved June 3, 2017.

Insects of Asia
Arhopala
Insects of Malaysia